Panagiotis Miliotis (born 16 April 1965) is a Greek rower. He competed in the men's lightweight double sculls event at the 2000 Summer Olympics.

References

1965 births
Living people
Greek male rowers
Olympic rowers of Greece
Rowers at the 2000 Summer Olympics
Rowers from Ioannina